State Route 34 (SR 34) is a state highway located in East Tennessee. The  route traverses several cities through eight counties from the Knoxville area to the North Carolina state line via Greeneville and Bristol. The portion from Carter to Bristol is concurrent with U.S. Route 11E (US 11E) while the portion from Bristol to North Carolina is concurrent with US 421.

Route description
SR 34 is a hidden route as it follows the routes of certain U.S. highways throughout its course. SR 34 begins with following US 11E (Andrew Johnson Highway) east of  Knoxville. It continues to follow that U.S. route through Jefferson City and Morristown. Continuing to concurrently with US 11E, SR 34 crosses Interstate 81 (I-81) and traverses Greeneville, Jonesborough, and then U.S. Route 19W joins in the concurrency starting with the I-26 exit 20 interchange in Johnson City. US 321 is also concurrent with SR 34 from Tusculum to Johnson City.

At Bluff City, US 19E merges with US 19W to make US 19 part of SR 34's concurrency with US 11E until it reaches Bristol. Just short of the Virginia state line, SR 34 joins US 421 eastbound to cross Holston Lake, goes through Mountain City, and terminates at the North Carolina state line near Trade.

Tennessee State Route 34 is primary, except for a small portion between State Route 91 and State Route 381 in Washington County.

Since 1994, a access-controlled bypass route of SR 34 in Greeneville has been proposed and studied by TDOT.

Major intersections

See also

References

External links

U.S. Route 11
U.S. Route 19
U.S. Route 421
034
Transportation in Knoxville, Tennessee
Transportation in Knox County, Tennessee
Transportation in Jefferson County, Tennessee
Transportation in Hamblen County, Tennessee
Transportation in Hawkins County, Tennessee
Transportation in Greene County, Tennessee
Transportation in Washington County, Tennessee
Transportation in Sullivan County, Tennessee
Transportation in Johnson County, Tennessee